In Greek mythology, Adamanthea or Adamanteia was a nymph who helped raise the infant Zeus to hide him from his father, Cronus.

Mythology
Adamanthea along with the goat-nymph Amalthea are revered as the foster mothers of Zeus. Reacting to a prophecy from his mother Gaia that his own offspring would overthrow his supreme position in the pantheon, Cronus swallowed all of his children immediately after birth.  Rhea, Zeus' mother and Cronus' wife, deceived Cronus by giving him a stone wrapped to look like a baby instead of Zeus, whom she instead gave to Adamanthea to nurse. Since Cronus ruled over the earth, the heavens and the sea, Adamanthea hid Zeus by dangling him on a rope from a tree, suspended between earth, sea and sky, and thus invisible to his father.

Note

Reference 

 Bell, Robert E., Women of Classical Mythology: A Biographical Dictionary. ABC-Clio. 1991. .

External links 

ADAMANTHEA: Spiritual beings from Greek Mythology

Nymphs